The 2011–12 George Mason Patriots men's basketball team represented George Mason University during the 2011–12 college basketball season. This was the 46th season for the program. The Patriots, led by first year head coach Paul Hewitt, are members of the Colonial Athletic Association and played their home games at the Patriot Center. They finished the season 24–9, 14–4 in CAA play. They lost in the semifinals of the 2011 CAA men's basketball tournament to VCU.

Awards
NCAA Men's Basketball All-Americans
 Ryan Pearson - Honorable Mention

CAA Player of the Year
 Ryan Pearson

First Team All-CAA
 Ryan Pearson

CAA Player of the Week
 Ryan Pearson - Jan. 2
 Ryan Pearson - Jan. 30

Roster

Stats

Game log

|-
!colspan=12 style=| Exhibition

|-
!colspan=12 style=| Non-conference regular season

|-
!colspan=12 style=|<span style=>CAA regular season

|-
!colspan=12 style=|CAA tournament

|-
|colspan=9| Notes: 1 - Denotes Daily Attendance

Recruiting
The following is a list of players signed for the 2012–13 season:

References

George Mason Patriots men's basketball seasons
George Mason
George Mason
George Mason